At the 1956 Winter Olympics in Cortina d'Ampezzo, Italy, the six alpine skiing events were held from Friday, 27 January to Friday, 3 February.

Toni Sailer of Austria won all three men's events to become the first alpine ski racer to win three gold medals in a single Olympics.  The feat has been repeated once, by Jean-Claude Killy in 1968.

The races were held at the adjacent Tofana, except for the men's giant slalom, which was held at Monte Faloria. The men's downhill was the final event.

Medal summary

Men's events

Source:

Women's events

Source:

Medal table

Course information

Source:

World championships
From 1948 through 1980, the alpine skiing events at the Winter Olympics also served as the World Championships, held every two years.  With the addition of the giant slalom, the combined event was dropped for 1950 and 1952, but returned as a World Championship event in 1954 as a "paper race" which used the results from the three events. During the Olympics from 1956 through 1980, World Championship medals were awarded by the FIS for the combined event. The combined returned as a separate event at the World Championships in 1982 and at the Olympics in 1988.

Combined

Men's Combined

Downhill: 3 February, Giant Slalom: 29 January, Slalom: 31 January

Women's Combined

Downhill: 1 February, Giant Slalom: 27 January, Slalom: 30 January

References

External links
International Olympic Committee results database
FIS-Ski.com – results – 1956 Olympics – Cortina d'Ampezzo, Italy
FIS-Ski.com – results – 1956 World Championships – Cortina d'Ampezzo, Italy

 
1956 Winter Olympics events
Alpine skiing at the Winter Olympics
1956 in alpine skiing
Alpine skiing competitions in Italy